Ross Memorial Hospital is a health facility in Ferry Road, Dingwall, Scotland. It is managed by NHS Highland. It is a Category B listed building.

History
The facility, which was designed by William Cumming Joass, was built as a memorial to Dr William Ross and opened in 1873. Additions included a new isolation hospital in 1909 and a new maternity wing in 1939 and, after joining the National Health Service in 1948, a new out-patient department opened in 1962.

References

Hospital buildings completed in 1873
Hospitals in Highland (council area)
Hospitals established in 1873
NHS Scotland hospitals
1873 establishments in Scotland